The 1977 Virginia Slims of Washington  was a women's tennis tournament played on indoor carpet courts in and near Washington D.C., District of Columbia in the United States that was part of the 1977 Virginia Slims World Championship Series. The first round and quarterfinals were held at the GWU Charles Smith Center while the semifinals and final were played at the Capital Centre. It was the sixth edition of the tournament and was held from January 3 through January 9, 1977. Third-seeded Martina Navratilova won the singles title, her second after 1975, and earned $20,000 first-prize money.

Finals

Singles
 Martina Navratilova defeated  Chris Evert 6–2, 6–3
 It was Navratilova's 1st singles title of the year and the 8th of her career.

Doubles
 Martina Navratilova /  Betty Stöve defeated  Kristien Kemmer /  Valerie Ziegenfuss 7–5, 6–2

Prize money

See also
 Evert–Navratilova rivalry

References

External links
 International Tennis Federation (ITF) tournament edition details

Virginia Slims of Washington
Virginia Slims of Washington
1977 in sports in Washington, D.C.
Virgin